Miriam Morgenstern (born 20 May 1987) is a German actress and singer.

Filmography 
 2001: Das Duo
 2002: Family Affairs
 2004: Summer Storm
 2005: Weißblaue Wintergeschichten
 2005: Kommissarin Lucas
 2005:  – 
 2006: Der beste Lehrer der Welt
 2011: Für immer 30

References

External links 
 
 

1987 births
Living people
German television actresses
German film actresses
21st-century German women singers